Fatty acid-binding protein, epidermal is a protein that in humans is encoded by the FABP5 gene.

Function 

This gene encodes the fatty acid binding protein found in epidermal cells, and was first identified as being upregulated in psoriasis tissue. Fatty acid binding proteins are a family of small, highly conserved, cytoplasmic proteins that bind long-chain fatty acids and other hydrophobic ligands. It is thought that FABPs roles include fatty acid uptake, transport, and metabolism.

The phytocannabinoids (THC and CBD) inhibit endocannabinoid anandamide (AEA) uptake by targeting FABP5, and competition for FABPs may in part or wholly explain the increased circulating levels of endocannabinoids reported after consumption of cannabinoids. Results show that cannabinoids inhibit keratinocyte proliferation, and therefore support a potential role for cannabinoids in the treatment of psoriasis.

Interactions 

FABP5 has been shown to interact with S100A7.

References

Further reading